Anthidium caspicum is a species of bee in the family Megachilidae, the leaf-cutter, carder, or mason bees.

Synonyms
Synonyms for this species include:
Anthidium labrosum Pasteels, 1969

References

caspicum
Insects described in 1880